Fred Bryan (born 1961) is an official in the National Football League wearing uniform number 11, part of two Super Bowl crews.

Officiating career 
Bryan began refereeing in 2009, and is an umpire. He was part of the Alternate Team of Officials for Super Bowl XLIX in Arizona. He served as the Area Director of Adult Services for Hennepin County Dept of Community Corrections, retiring from that position in 2018. He was the Umpire for the official crew at Super Bowl LIII. On January 19, 2021, he was announced as a member of the Super Bowl LV Officiating Crew.  He has a wife and two daughters.

References 

National Football League officials
1961 births
Living people